What We Do in the Shadows is an American mockumentary comedy horror television series created by Jemaine Clement that premiered March 27, 2019, on FX. The second television series in the franchise based on the 2014 New Zealand film of the same name written by Clement and Taika Waititi, the series follows four vampire roommates in Staten Island, and stars Kayvan Novak, Matt Berry, Natasia Demetriou, Harvey Guillén, and Mark Proksch.

Four seasons of the series have aired and it was renewed for a fifth and sixth season ahead of the fourth season premiere. It has been critically acclaimed (particularly for its cast and writing) and nominated for 17 Emmy Awards, including Outstanding Comedy Series in 2020 and 2022.

Premise
Set primarily in Staten Island,  New York City, New York, What We Do in the Shadows follows the lives of three traditional vampires, Nandor, Laszlo, and Nadja; Colin Robinson, an energy vampire; and Guillermo, Nandor's familiar. The series revolves around the vampires interacting with the modern world and other supernatural beings.

Cast and characters

Main
 Kayvan Novak as Nandor the Relentless – Once the bloodthirsty leader of the fictional kingdom of Al-Quolanudar in southern Iran and a warrior serving the Ottoman Empire. At age 760, he is the oldest vampire and the self-proclaimed leader of the group, leading him to frequently calling house meetings for frivolous discussions. Although he genuinely cares for his human familiar Guillermo, he has difficulty expressing it. Nandor is also quite naive to the ways of modern society and humans, which often results in Guillermo becoming frustrated with him. He is a massive fan of the 1992 Dream Team and collects much of their memorabilia; they also inspired him to apply for American citizenship, but he fails his test after being physically unable to say the phrase One Nation, Under God.
 Matt Berry as Leslie "Laszlo" Cravensworth – A 310-year-old British nobleman vampire who was turned by Nadja and is now married to her. He is pansexual and a former porn actor, who is often preoccupied with thoughts of sex; he enjoys sexual relationships with both Nadja and Nandor. He also enjoys making topiary sculptures of vulvas in the yard, including those of his wife and mother. He confessed in season 1 to having been Jack the Ripper. In season 2, he briefly goes on the run and assumes the alias "Jackie Daytona", a "regular human bartender" in Clairton, Pennsylvania (which he chose because it sounded like Transylvania).
 Natasia Demetriou as Nadja of Antipaxos – A 500-year-old Greek Romani vampire who turned Laszlo into a vampire and later married him. She is frequently frustrated with her male housemates and nostalgic about her human life. She has entertained an affair with a reincarnated knight named Gregor for hundreds of years, only for him to be decapitated in every reincarnation. In season 3, she reveals that she frequently collaborated with the Rat Pack and later becomes manager of her own vampire nightclub in season 4.
 Demetriou also plays Nadja's human ghost, split from its corporeal form when Nadja was turned into a vampire. The ghost later inhabits a doll, and appears as a recurring character since season two.
 Harvey Guillén as Guillermo de la Cruz – Nandor's long-suffering Latino familiar. Despite his frustration with his unreasonable workload and Nandor's disregard for his mortality, he has served his master for more than a decade in the hope of being made a vampire, a dream inspired by Armand in the 1994 film Interview with the Vampire. Late in season one, Guillermo discovers that he is a descendant of the famous vampire hunter Abraham Van Helsing, and he proves to be very skilled at killing vampires (including by accident), giving him conflicting feelings about his desire to become a vampire. Guillermo's skill as a vampire slayer leads to him becoming a bodyguard for Nandor, Nadja, and Laszlo in the third season. He reveals he is gay in the fourth season, coming out to his family, with Nadja having to erase their memories about Guillermo's confession about wishing to become a vampire.
 Mark Proksch as Colin Robinson (seasons 1–3) and Baby Colin "The Boy" (season 4) – An energy vampire who lives in the basement. He lives by draining humans and vampires of their energy by being boring or frustrating. As a "day walker", he is not harmed by sunlight or entry into churches and is able to work in a cubicle office and feed on his coworkers' frustrations. Unlike the others, he shows no outward sign of vampirism except that his irises glow when he feeds on energy, and his reflection shows a pale and decrepit version of himself. The others are continually annoyed by him and often try to avoid associating with him, although they are entirely dependent on him as he is the only source of income into the house. In the third season finale, following Colin Robinson's 100th birthday, he dies and his infant offspring (also portrayed by Proksch) bursts out of his chest; Laszlo (having become friends with the original Colin Robinson) elects to raise the child as his own.

Recurring
 Anthony Atamanuik as Sean Rinaldi – The human next-door neighbor. He sometimes witnesses Laszlo doing something vampiric, but is easily hypnotized into forgetting everything. The vampires spare him because he brings their trash cans in when they forget, and Laszlo considers Sean his best friend and even makes sexual advances toward him (which Sean forgets due to hypnosis).
 Beanie Feldstein as Jenna – a LARPer and virgin whom Guillermo lured for the vampires to feast on. She was later transformed into a vampire by Nadja who witnessed her being treated poorly by her peers. During her vampire training with Nadja, she discovers she has the rare ability to turn invisible, which fits the tendency of people to ignore her. (season 1)
 Doug Jones as Baron Afanas – An ancient vampire from the Old Country who believes vampires should rule the world. Both Nadja and Laszlo had secret affairs with the Baron despite his lack of genitals. Later it is disclosed that he is not actually a Baron, but simply "barren" because he was unable to have children. In the first season, Guillermo inadvertently kills the Baron by opening a door and exposing him to sunlight. In the third season, however, it is revealed that he barely survived, albeit reduced to his head, torso and left arm. He finally has his full body restored with a more youthful appearance in the fourth season. (seasons 1, 3–4)
 Nick Kroll as Simon the Devious – A vampire who rules over the Manhattan vampires and owns the Sassy Cat nightclub. He was a close friend to the Staten Island trio when all the vampires first arrived in America. He is obsessed with Laszlo's cursed hat made out of witch skin. (guest seasons 1–2, 4)
 Jake McDorman as Jeff Suckler – A reincarnation of Nadja's former human lover, Gregor, a knight who has been killed by decapitation in each of his lives. Nadja eventually restores Jeff's memories of his previous lives so that he can be more like his former self, leading to him falling into insanity and being committed to a mental institution. It is later revealed to Nadja and Gregor that Laszlo had been causing each of his deaths through history, which he does again. (season 1; guest season 2)
 Kristen Schaal as The Guide (also known as the "Floating Woman") – An envoy of the Vampiric Council who likes to float and sometimes speak in a demonic voice. In season 4 she becomes close with Nadja and helps her convert the Vampiric Council's headquarters into a vampiric nightclub. (seasons 3–4; guest season 1)
 Marissa Jaret Winokur as Charmaine Rinaldi – Sean's wife. (guest seasons 2–4)
 Anoop Desai as Djinn – Nandor's magical genie (season 4)
 Parisa Fakhri as Marwa – Nandor's resurrected ex-wife, now fiancée (season 4)
 Chris Sandiford as Derek – A vampire hunter turned vampire (seasons 2–4)
 Myrna Cabello as Silvia – Guillermo's mother (seasons 2, 4)
 Veronika Slowikowska as Shanice – Jenna's college roommate who witnesses her transformation into a vampire. Shanice later joins the Mosquito Collectors of the Tri-State Area, a secret team of amateur vampire hunters. (seasons 1; guest seasons 2–3)

Guests

Season 1
 Arj Barker as Arjan – The pack leader of the Staten Island Werewolf Support Group. He entered into the truce between his kind and the vampires (which was created in 1993).
 Dave Bautista and Alexandra Henrikson as Garrett and Vasillika the Defiler – A duo of vampires imprisoned by the Council after Garrett was framed by Laszlo for turning a baby into a vampire (which is very illegal), and Vasillika for too much defiling.
 Vanessa Bayer as Evie Russell – Colin Robinson's co-worker. He discovers that she is an advanced form of energy vampire — an emotional vampire — who feeds off of the pity and sadness generated by her outlandish stories of suffering and misfortune. She and Colin Robinson date for a short time, feeding together on bored and pitying humans, until he begins to feel the relationship is unhealthy. Her first name is a homophone of "E.V.", for Emotional Vampire.
 Mary Gillis as June – Nadja and Laszlo's familiar. She appears to be an ill old woman that communicates through grunts. She is killed when the Baron sucks all her blood when he arrives on Staten Island.
 Jeremy O. Harris as Colby – A human familiar to Dantos the Cruel and Radinka the Brutal, two 400-year-old vampires who appear to be children while Colby portrays as their father.
 Marceline Hugot as Barbara Lazarro – The president of the Staten Island Council. She was going to be the vampires' way of taking over Staten Island until Laszlo left a pile of dead raccoons on her doorstep in an attempt to win her trust, resulting in her believing it was a form of terrorist threat.
 Gloria Laino as The Baron's Familiar – The Baron's familiar, who maintains a silent, watchful eye on the vampires of Staten Island as her master awakes. Guillermo says that she pops out of nowhere and hears "everything".
 Paul Reubens as Paul – A member of the Council.
 Tilda Swinton as a fictionalized version of herself who is the leader of the Vampiric Council.
 Wesley Snipes as Wesley the Daywalker / Wesley Sykes – A half-vampire member of the Council who could not participate in person but only video chat through Skype. Danny despises him, claiming he is a vampire hunter, which he denies.
 Hayden Szeto as Jonathan – A LARPer college student that Guillermo lured for the vampires to feast on. However, Colin Robinson beat them to it by draining his energy instead.
 Danny Trejo as Danny – A Hispanic tattooed member of the Council. He has an open dislike towards Wesley.
 Taika Waititi, Jonathan Brugh, and Jemaine Clement reprise their roles as Viago von Dorna Schmarten Scheden Heimburg, Deacon Brucke, and Vladislav the Poker from the original film. Three vampires arrived from New Zealand to participate in the Vampiric Council.
 Bobby Wilson as Marcus – The actual Native American member of the Werewolf Pack. He is Native American, and a werewolf but, as he explains, "Not a werewolf because" he is Native American. "It's not an ethnic thing."
 Evan Rachel Wood as Evan the Immortal Princess of the Undead – A member of the Council who just goes by her first name.
 Hannan Younis as Ange – An African American werewolf and part of Arjan's group. She undermines Arjan's rules  and is openly hostile towards Nadja due to Nadja's insulting the werewolves by assuming they are all "Indian" (as in, Native Americans).

Season 2
 James Frain as the voice of Black Peter – A goat and witch's familiar
 Mark Hamill as Jim the Vampire – A vampire who claims that Laszlo owes him rent money from the 1800s and demands retribution.
 Greta Lee as Celeste – A familiar who pretends to be a vampire
 Haley Joel Osment as Topher – Nadja and Laszlo's familiar who is accidentally killed and revived as a zombie. Unlike Guillermo, Topher has no interest in becoming a vampire. He is energetic, fun-loving, and charismatic, and he is well-liked by all other members of the household, except Guillermo.
 Lucy Punch as Lilith – A witch and rival of Nadja
 Craig Robinson as Claude – The leader of the Mosquito Collectors of the Tri-State Area, a secret team of amateur vampire hunters.
 Benedict Wong as Wallace – A necromancer and tchotchke salesman.

Season 3
 Julie Klausner and Cole Escola as The Gargoyles – A duo of gargoyles who gossip and give tips to The Guide.
 Lauren Collins as Meg – A gym receptionist on whom Nandor has a crush.
 Tyler Alvarez as Wes Blankenship – The leader of a group of rebellious young vampires that refuse to follow the Council's orders.
 Aida Turturro as Gail – Nandor's on-again, off-again werewolf-turned-vampire girlfriend.
 Catherine Cohen as Sheila – The siren
 Scott Bakula as himself
 Cree Summer as Jan – A vampire scam artist who is head of the Post-Chiropterean Wellness Center cult
 Donal Logue as a fictionalized vampire version of himself
 Khandi Alexander as Contessa Carmilla De Mornay
 David Cross as Dominykas the Dreadful

Season 4
 Affion Crockett as Richie Suck, superstar vampire rapper
 Fred Armisen as Doctor DJ Tom Schmidt, Richie Suck's familiar who is manipulating him for financial gain.
 Sal Vulcano as himself
 Sklar Brothers as Toby and Bran
 Al Roberts as Freddie, Guillermo's boyfriend
 Sofia Coppola as herself
 Thomas Mars as himself
 Jim Jarmusch as himself
 Michael McDonald as Gustave Leroy

Episodes

Season 1 (2019)

Season 2 (2020)

Season 3 (2021)

Season 4 (2022)

Production

Development

On January 22, 2018, it was announced that FX had given the production a pilot order. The pilot was written by Jemaine Clement and directed by Taika Waititi, both of whom are also executive producers alongside Scott Rudin, Paul Simms, Garrett Basch, and Eli Bush. On May 3, 2018, it was announced that FX had given the production a series order for a first season consisting of ten episodes, which premiered on March 27, 2019.

According to Clement: "We stay pretty basic '70s/'80s vampire rules, with a little bit of '30s. They can turn into bats. They can't go in the sunlight; they don't sparkle in the sun, they die. They have to be invited in; in a lot of literature vampires have to be invited into private buildings, but this is a documentary so it's the real rules which means they have to be invited into any building." Clement has also stated that the part of Laszlo was written specifically for Berry. The main influences on the series are Fright Night, Martin, The Lost Boys, Nosferatu, Interview with the Vampire, Vampire's Kiss, and Bram Stoker's Dracula. The character Nadja was named after the 1994 film of the same name.

The song used in the opening credits is "You're Dead" by Norma Tanega (1966), which was used during the opening credits sequence in the original film.

The second season premiered on April 15, 2020. On May 22, 2020, FX renewed the series for a third season, which premiered on September 2, 2021. On August 13, 2021, FX renewed the series for a fourth season, ahead of the third season premiere. Upon the fourth season's renewal, it was reported that Rudin would no longer be an executive producer, beginning with the third season, due to allegations of abusive behavior. On June 6, 2022, FX renewed the series for a fifth and sixth season, ahead of the fourth season premiere.

Filming
Principal photography for the first season took place from October 22 to December 18, 2018, in Toronto, Ontario. Filming for the third season began on February 8, 2021, and finished on May 3, 2021.

The writer/producer Paul Simms said that series does not use CGI effects: "There's no fully digital characters or anything like that. One of the movies we really talked about a lot when we were conceiving the show was Francis Ford Coppola's Dracula where he went back to really doing as many effects as possible in camera and figuring out ways to do that. One of my favorite supernatural moments is completely in camera. It's where Beanie Feldstein's character is walking along in the park and Nadja appears walking next to her. That was all just done completely the old fashioned way where Natasia was hiding behind a tree and the camera was tracking along and at the right moment, she walked out from behind a tree. I think there's something about that old fashioned way that makes things more interesting than when you can tell it's digital and rubbery and fake looking".

Among the cinematographers D.J. Stipsen and Christian Sprenger's influences for the series was the work of Michael Ballhaus and production designer Thomas E. Sanders on the Coppola-directed Bram Stoker's Dracula: "We referenced that film for the general sumptuousness of the vampires' mansion, which was our main set. Our take, however, was that the Staten Island vampires have let their place go. The former glory is evident but now exists in a worn, faded and distressed state. Production designer Kate Bunch and I had a lot of conversations about striking the right balance between sumptuousness and neglect. There are strong reds, but also yellow that has faded to the point of being a warm brown."

Release

Marketing
On October 31, 2018, a series of teaser trailers for the series were released. On January 10, 2019, another teaser trailer was released. On February 4, 2019, the official trailer for the series was released.

Premiere
On October 7, 2018, the series held a panel at the annual New York Comic Con moderated by Rolling Stones Alan Sepinwall and featuring co-creators Taika Waititi and Jemaine Clement, along with fellow executive producer Paul Simms. Before the panel began, the first episode of the series was screened for the audience. The world premiere for the series was screened during the 2019 South by Southwest film festival in Austin, Texas as a part of the festival's "Episodic Premieres" series.

Reception

Critical response

The first season received acclaim from critics. On the review aggregator Rotten Tomatoes, the first season has an approval rating of 94%, based on 71 reviews, with an average rating of 7.8/10. The website's critical consensus reads, "Delightfully absurd and ridiculously fun, What We Do in the Shadows expands on the film's vampiric lore and finds fresh perspective in its charming, off-kilter cast to create a mockumentary series worth sinking your teeth into." On Metacritic, it has a weighted average score of 80 out of 100, based on 30 critics, indicating "generally favorable reviews".

The second season also received critical acclaim. On Rotten Tomatoes, the second season has an approval rating of 98%, based on 44 reviews, with an average rating of 8.3/10. The website's critical consensus reads, "Bat! What We Do In the Shadows loses no steam in a smashing second season that savvily expands its supernatural horizons while doubling down on the fast flying fun." On Metacritic, it has a weighted average score of 79 out of 100, based on 11 critics, indicating "generally favorable reviews".

The third season also received universal acclaim from critics. On Rotten Tomatoes, the third season has an approval rating of 100%, based on 28 reviews, with an average rating of 9/10. The website's critical consensus reads, "Carried on the wings of its cast's incredible chemistry and the strongest writing of the series so far, What We Do in the Shadows third season is scary good." On Metacritic, the third season has an average score of 96 out of 100, based on 11 critics, indicating "universal acclaim".

The fourth season also received universal acclaim from critics. On Rotten Tomatoes, the fourth season has an approval rating of 100%, based on 29 reviews, with an average rating of 8.7/10. The website's critical consensus reads, "Aside from turning this demonic household into Three Vampires and a Baby, What We Do in the Shadows doubles down on what it does best without drastically changing the formula – and remains fang-tastic all the same." On Metacritic, the fourth season has an average score of 84 out of 100, based on 8 critics, indicating "universal acclaim". However, some critics complained of the reductive treatment of Nandor's wife, Marwa, in season 4. Comic Book Resources complained of the show "stripping a woman of her identity – physically and mentally – for laughs" and The Mary Sue stated that "What We Do in the Shadows missed hard with its treatment of Marwa."

Ratings

Season 1

Season 2

Season 3

Season 4

Accolades

Notes

References

External links
 
 
 

2010s American horror comedy television series
2010s American LGBT-related comedy television series
2010s American mockumentary television series
2019 American television series debuts
2020s American horror comedy television series
2020s American LGBT-related comedy television series
2020s American mockumentary television series
American fantasy television series
English-language television shows
FX Networks original programming
Live action television shows based on films
Television shows filmed in Toronto
Television shows set in Staten Island
Urban fantasy
Vampires in television